Samuel Harrison was a Canadian politician.

Samuel Harrison may also refer to:

Rev. Samuel Harrison (1818–1900), African-American minister
Samuel Harrison (singer) (1760–1812), English singer
Samuel Smith Harrison (1780–1853), U.S. representative
Sam Harrison (cyclist) (born 1992), Welsh racing cyclist

See also
Sam Harrison (disambiguation)